The Anzick site (24PA506) in Park County, Montana, United States, is the only known Clovis burial site in the New World. The term "Clovis" is used by archaeologists to define one of the New World's earliest hunter-gatherer cultures and is named after the site near Clovis, New Mexico, where human artifacts were found associated with the procurement and processing of mammoth and other large and small fauna.

Discovery

In 1961, while hunting marmots at a sandstone outcrop on the Anzick family property, about one mile south of Wilsall, Montana, Bill Roy Bray found a stone projectile point and bones that were covered with red ocher. In the same area, in May 1968, Ben Hargis and Calvin Sarver of Wilsall, Montana were removing talus from the same outcrop and inadvertently found the red ocher-covered partial remains of a one- to two-year-old child (Anzick-1) associated with stone (8 fluted projectile points, scrapers, heat treated bi-faces), bone and antler artifacts, totaling 90, that were radiocarbon dated at about 12,000 years Before Present. Nineteen additional artifacts were found in the area. Two antler rods associated with the burial also radiocarbon dated to the same time. The stone use came from 6 different quarries.  In another location in the same area, not associated with the Clovis child, the men found a partial skull fragment of a 6- to 8-year-old male child (Anzick-2) that radiocarbon dated to around 8600 years Before Present. Dr. Larry Lahren, a North American archaeologist from Livingston, Montana was the first researcher to examine and record the site (24PA506), artifacts and human remains at the request of Ben Hargis not long after the discovery in 1968. The artifacts, not including the human remains, are at the Montana Historical Society and the Smithsonian National Museum of Natural History.

Human remains

For thirty years, the skeletal remains were in the private possession of a former investigator. Since 1998, they have been in the possession of one of the landowners. Because of the manner in which the site was discovered, its importance was initially dismissed but subsequently confirmed.  The remains are known as Anzick-1.

References

Further reading
 Canby, T. Y., "Far-flung Search for the First Americans", National Geographic Magazine 156(3), pp. 330-363, 1979
 Jennifer Raff and Deborah a. Bolnick, "Genetic Roots of the First Americans", Nature 506, pp. 162–163. 2014
 White, Samuel Stockton V., "The Anzick Site: Cultural Balance and the Treatment of Ancient Human Remains (Toward a Collaborative Standard)", Theses, Dissertations, Professional Papers, Missoula, MT: University of Montana ScholarWorks, Graduate School, M.A. Thesis, 2015
 White, Samuel Stockton V., "THE ANZICK ARTIFACTS: A HIGH-TECHNOLOGY FORAGER TOOL ASSEMBLAGE", Ph.D. Dissertation, Graduate Student Theses, Dissertations, & Professional Papers, 2019
 "Investigating The First Peoples,The Clovis Child Burial" - Montana Curriculum Guide - 2014

Clovis sites
Park County, Montana
Oldest human remains in the Americas